Apocalypse Max: Better Dead Than Undead is an iOS 2D platform/shooting game developed by American studio Wandake and released on September 14, 2012.

Critical reception

The game received "favorable" reviews according to the review aggregation website Metacritic.

References

2012 video games
Android (operating system) games
IOS games
Run and gun games
Side-scrolling video games
Video games developed in the United States
Video games about zombies